The Dingley Act of 1884 was a United States law introduced by U.S. Representative Nelson Dingley, Jr. of Maine dealing with American mariners serving in the United States Merchant Marine.

Among other things, the act:
prohibited advances on wages, and
limited the making of seamen's allotments (payment of part of a seaman's wages to another party) to only close relatives.

In 1886, a loophole to the Dingley Act was created, allowing boardinghouse keepers to receive seamen's allotments.

The legislation replaced the Shipping Commissioners Act of 1872.

Notes

References

See also

Shanghaiing
Maritime history of the United States

1884 in American law
United States federal admiralty and maritime legislation